Cutlet (derived from French côtelette, côte, "rib") refers to:

 a thin slice of meat from the leg or ribs of mutton, veal, pork, or chicken 
 a dish made of such slice, often breaded (also known in various languages as a cotoletta, Kotelett, kotlet or kotleta)
 a croquette or cutlet-shaped patty made of ground meat
 a kind of fish cut where the fish is sliced perpendicular to the spine, rather than parallel (as with fillets); often synonymous with steak
 a prawn or shrimp with its head and outer shell removed, leaving only the flesh and tail
 a mash of vegetables (usually potatoes) fried with bread

History 
Cutlet were a typical starter in French cuisine, as a variation of Croquettes with a shape of small rib (côtelette in French). The bone was simulated by a piece of  fried bread or pasta. The recipe became popular in all Europe due to the influence of French cuisine.

American and Canadian cuisines 
From the late 1700s until about 1900, virtually all recipes for "cutlets" in English-language cookbooks referenced veal cutlets. Then pork cutlets began to appear. More recently, in American and Canadian cuisine, cutlets have also been made using chicken, although this was also imported from Europe. The cutlet is usually coated with flour, egg and bread crumbs, then fried in a pan with some oil.

Austrian cuisine

Australian cuisine 
Australians eat lamb cutlets battered with egg yolk and breadcrumbs.  Chicken cutlets are also very popular, but known as chicken schnitzel. Both lamb cutlets and chicken schnitzel are a staple of Australian children's cuisine. Amongst most Australians of Italian descent, the term schnitzel is replaced by the term cutlet. Cutlets amongst this population are usually veal or chicken.

British cuisine 
In British cuisine a cutlet is usually unbreaded and can also be called a chop. If referring to beef, more than one piece together would be generally called a rib of beef or a rib joint, whilst lamb ribs are called a rack, or rack of lamb.  Lamb racks can also be tied into a circular shape before cooking, with the ribs on the outside, giving a crown shape, leading to the name "crown of lamb".

French cuisine 
In France, cutlets can be made with any of the Salpicons of poultry, game, fish and shellfish, mixed with the necessary amount of forcemeat in keeping with the main ingredient; the consistency should be adjusted with a little well-reduced sauce which should also be in keeping with the ingredients.

These cutlets should be egg and crumbed and they should be shallow fried and coloured in clarified butter instead of being deep fried.

Hong Kong cuisine 
In Hong Kong, the cutlet was introduced during the period of British colonial occupation along with other cooking influences. It is seen as "sai chaan" or Western cuisine. Veal, pork and chicken are battered and deep fried for lunch. Seafood such as shrimp or scallop that is battered or breaded and deep fried can also be known as 'cutlet' in Hong Kong.  It is usually served alongside rice or spaghetti noodles.

Indian cuisine 

In Indian cuisine, a cutlet specifically refers to mashed vegetables (potato, carrot, beans) or cooked meat (beef, mutton, chicken or fish) stuffing that is fried with a batter/covering.  The meat itself is cooked with spices - onion, cardamom, cloves, cinnamon, coriander (cilantro), green chillies, lemon and salt.  This is then dipped in an egg mix or Corn starch and then in Bread crumbs (also see breaded cutlet), and fried in ghee or vegetable oil. Mostly  chicken and mutton cutlets are very popular snacks in the eastern part of India specially in Kolkata.

The vegetarian version has no meat in it, instead the filling is a combination of mashed potatoes, onion, green chillies, spices and salt, cooked for a bit together. This version is more popular with the vegetarian Indian population. This should not be confused with grilled patties such as Aloo Tikki. A cutlet is traditionally deep-fried.

Iranian cuisine 

In Iran, cutlet  (Persian: کتلت) is a popular hamburger-like thin layered mixture of fried ground beef or pea flour, mashed or grated potatoes, eggs, onions, spices and bread crumbs.

Italian cuisine 
The use of the cutlet (cotoletta) is quite widespread in Italian cuisine in many different variations. The most famous variant is the Milanese cutlet (cotoletta alla milanese), a veal cutlet covered in bread crumbs and fried in butter.  It should not be mistaken for the Wiener schnitzel (which should be referred as a scaloppina alla viennese, or as fettina impanata in Italian), because it's a different cut of meat; the Milanese cutlet cut includes the bone, whereas the Wienerschnitzel doesn't. It is disputed whether the cotoletta alla milanese originated the Wienerschnitzel, or vice versa.

Japanese cuisine 
The cutlet was introduced to Japan during the Meiji period, in a Western cuisine restaurant in the fashionable Ginza district of Tokyo.  The Japanese pronunciation of cutlet is katsuretsu.

In Japanese cuisine, katsuretsu or shorter katsu is actually the name for a Japanese version of the Wiener schnitzel, a breaded cutlet.  Dishes with katsu include tonkatsu and katsudon.

Polish cuisine 
The Polish pork cutlet, kotlet schabowy, is a pork chop coated with breadcrumbs. Kotlet schabowy can be served with mashed potatoes, home fries, fried mushrooms, cooked vegetables (cabbage), with salads or with coleslaw. Kotlet z kurczaka is a chicken cutlet coated with breadcrumbs. Kotlet z indyka is a turkey cutlet coated with breadcrumbs.

Cuisines of Russia, Ukraine and other countries of former Soviet Union 
In modern Russian, the word kotleta (котлета) refers almost exclusively to pan-fried minced meat croquettes / cutlet-shaped patties. Bread soaked in milk, onions, garlic, and herbs is usually present in the recipe. When in a hurry, a "cutlet" can be eaten between bread slices like a hamburger, but this fast meal is rarely served in restaurants. It is usually served with pan-fried potatoes, mashed potatoes, pasta, etc.

In the middle of the 20th century, industrially produced, semi-processed ground meat cutlets were introduced in the USSR. Colloquially known as Mikoyan cutlets (named after Soviet politician Anastas Mikoyan, who served as a minister of food industry for a long time and was responsible for introducing a lot of industrial-made products into the Soviet food chain), these were cheap pork or beef cutlet-shaped patties which resembled American burgers.

In Ukrainian cuisine, a variety called sichenyk is made of minced meat or fish and vegetables and covered with bread crumbs. 

A particular form of the Russian kotleta known as Pozharsky cutlet is an elaborated version of minced poultry kotleta covered with breadcrumbs or small croutons. A distinct feature of this cutlet is that butter is added to minced meat, which results in an especially juicy and tender consistency.

Another Russian version of a cutlet, called otbivnaya kotleta, meaning "beaten cutlet", is a fried slice of meat, usually pork or beef, beaten flat with a tenderizing hammer or knife handle and covered with beaten eggs, dough or breadcrumbs.  The recipe is similar to those of escalopes, schnitzel, Polish, or American cutlets.  Today, this dish is simply called otbivnaya, with the word kotleta reserved for minced meat patties.

Chicken Kiev is called kotleta po-kievski in Russian and similarly kotleta po-kyivski in Ukrainian, which means "Kiev-style cutlet".

Sri Lankan cuisine 
In Sri Lankan cuisine cutlets almost always refer to fish (usually tuna or mackerel) and potato croquettes. Usually the fish and potatoes are mixed with spices, green chilies and onions and dipped in a batter made of flour and eggs before being crumbed and fried.

References 

Meat
Cuts of meat
World cuisine
Types of food